This local electoral calendar for 2023 lists the subnational elections held, and scheduled to be held, in 2023. Referendums, recall and retention elections, and national by-elections (special elections) are also included. Specific dates are given where these are known.

January
 19 January: Tonga, Tongatapu 8, Legislative Assembly by-election
 22 January: France, National Assembly by-elections (1st round)
 29 January: 
 Austria, Lower Austria, Landtag
 France, National Assembly by-elections (2nd round)

February
 5 February: Ecuador, local elections
 6 February: Ethiopia, Southern Nations, Nationalities, and Peoples' Region, Regionalization referendum
 9 February: United Kingdom, West Lancashire, House of Commons by-election
 12 February: 
Germany, Berlin, House of Representatives
Switzerland
Basel-Landschaft, Executive Council and Cantonal Council
Zürich, Executive Council and Cantonal Council
12–13 February
Italy
Lombardy, President and Regional Council
Lazio, President and Regional Council
 16 February: India, Tripura, Legislative Assembly
21 February: United States, Virginia's 4th congressional district, U.S. House of Representatives special election
 25 February: Philippines, Cavite's 7th congressional district, Philippine House of Representatives special election
 27 February: India
 Meghalaya, Legislative Assembly
 Nagaland, Legislative Assembly
 28 February: United States, Chicago, Mayor, City Council, and other municipal positions

March
 5 March: 
 Austria, Carinthia, Landtag
 Lithuania, 
 Liechtenstein, Mayors and Municipal Councils 
 12 March: Switzerland, Appenzell-Innerrhoden, Executive Council and Cantonal Council
 13 March: 
 Canada, Quebec, Saint-Henri—Sainte-Anne, National Assembly by-election
 Guyana, Local elections
 15 March: Netherlands, Provincial elections
 16 March: Canada, Ontario, Hamilton Centre, Legislative Assembly by-election
 18 March: 
Australia, Northern Territory, Arafura, Legislative Assembly by-election
Nigeria, state elections
 Abia State, Governor and House of Assembly
 Adamawa State, Governor and House of Assembly
 Akwa Ibom State, Governor and House of Assembly
 Anambra State, House of Assembly
 Bauchi State, Governor and House of Assembly
 Bayelsa State, House of Assembly
 Benue State, Governor and House of Assembly
 Borno State, Governor and House of Assembly
 Cross River State, Governor and House of Assembly
 Delta State, Governor and House of Assembly
 Ebonyi State, Governor and House of Assembly
 Edo State, House of Assembly
 Ekiti State, House of Assembly
 Enugu State, Governor and House of Assembly
 Gombe State, Governor and House of Assembly
 Imo State, House of Assembly
 Jigawa State, Governor and House of Assembly
 Kaduna State, Governor and House of Assembly
 Kano State, Governor and House of Assembly
 Katsina State, Governor and House of Assembly
 Kebbi State, Governor and House of Assembly
 Kogi State, House of Assembly
 Kwara State, Governor and House of Assembly
 Lagos State, Governor and House of Assembly
 Nasarawa State, Governor and House of Assembly
 Niger State, Governor and House of Assembly
 Ogun State, Governor and House of Assembly
 Ondo State, House of Assembly
 Osun State, House of Assembly
 Oyo State, Governor and House of Assembly
 Plateau State, Governor and House of Assembly
 Rivers State, Governor and House of Assembly
 Sokoto State, Governor and House of Assembly
 Taraba State, Governor and House of Assembly
 Yobe State, Governor and House of Assembly
 Zamfara State, Governor and House of Assembly
 19 March: Lithuania, 
 21 March: United States, Jacksonville, Mayor
 25 March: Australia, New South Wales, Legislative Assembly and Legislative Council
 26 March: France, Ariège's 1st constituency, National Assembly by-election (1st round)

April

 1 April: France, Second constituency for French residents overseas, National Assembly by-election (1st round)
 2 April: 
 France, National Assembly by-elections (1st round)
 Switzerland
 Geneva, Executive Council and Cantonal Council
 Lucerne, Executive Council and Cantonal Council
 Ticino, Executive Council and Cantonal Council
 2–3 April: Italy
 Friuli-Venezia Giulia, President and Regional Council
 3 April: Canada, Prince Edward Island, Legislative Assembly
 4 April: United States 
 Chicago, Mayor run-off
 Colorado Springs, Mayor
 Denver, Mayor
 Los Angeles, City Council, District 6 special election
 Wisconsin, Supreme Court
9 April: Pakistan
Punjab, Provincial Assembly
Khyber Pakhtunkhwa, Khyber Pakhtunkhwa Assembly
 15 April: France, National Assembly by-elections (2nd round)
 16 April: 
 Argentina
Neuquén, provincial elections
Río Negro, provincial elections
 France, National Assembly by-elections (2nd round)
 23 April: Austria, Salzburg, Landtag

May
2 May: United States, Lincoln, Mayor
 4 May: United Kingdom, local elections
 7 May: Argentina
Jujuy, provincial elections
La Rioja, provincial elections
Misiones, provincial elections
 14 May: 
 Italy, local elections (1st round)
 Germany
 Bremen, Bürgerschaft and city councils
 Schleswig-Holstein, Local elections
Argentina
La Pampa, provincial elections
Salta, provincial elections
San Juan, provincial elections
Tierra del Fuego, provincial elections
Tucumán, provincial elections
21 May: Argentina, Formosa, provincial elections
 24 May: Nigeria, Cross River State, Local Government Councils and Chairmen
 28 May: 
Italy, local elections (2nd round)
Spain, Regional elections
 Aragon, Cortes
 Asturias, General Junta
Balearic Islands, Parliament (will take place no later than 25 June 2023)
Canary Islands, Parliament (will take place no later than 25 June 2023)
 Cantabria, Parliament
 Castilla–La Mancha, Cortes
 Ceuta, Assembly
 Extremadura, Assembly
 La Rioja, Parliament
 Madrid, Assembly
 Melilla, Assembly
 Murcia, Regional Assembly
 Navarre, Parliament
 Valencian Community, Corts
 Local elections
 Barcelona, City Council
 Madrid, City Council
 Seville, City Council
 Valencia, City Council
 Zaragoza, City Council
 29 May: Canada, Alberta, Legislative Assembly

June 
11 June: Argentina, San Luis, provincial elections
18 June: Argentina, Córdoba, provincial elections

August 
3 August: United States, Nashville, Mayor

September
 10 September: Argentina, Santa Fe, provincial elections
 11 September: Norway, municipal elections
 17 September: Argentina, Chaco, provincial elections
 24 September: Argentina, Mendoza, provincial elections

October
 3 October: Canada
 Manitoba, Legislative Assembly
 Northwest Territories, Legislative Assembly
 8 October: 
 Germany
 Bavaria, Landtag
 Hesse, Landtag
Argentina
Chubut, provincial elections
 15 October: Greek local elections
 16 October: Canada, Nunavut, Iqaluit, municipal election
 22 October: Trentino-Alto Adige/Südtirol, Provincial Councils
 24 October: Argentina
 Buenos Aires, provincial elections
 Buenos Aires City, city elections
 Catamarca, provincial elections
 Santa Cruz, provincial elections
 31 October: Israel, municipal elections

November
 7 November: United States
 Arizona
 Tucson, Mayor
 Connecticut 
 Hartford, Mayor
 New Haven, Mayor
Indiana
Indianapolis, Mayor
 Kentucky 
 Governor, Attorney General, other executive positions
 Louisiana 
 Governor, Attorney General, other executive positions
 State Senate and House of Representatives
 New Jersey 
 State Senate and General Assembly
 Maine
 Portland, Mayor
Massachusetts
Worcester, Mayor
 Mississippi 
 Governor, Attorney General, other executive positions
 State Senate and House of Representatives
New York
New York City, City Council
 Pennsylvania
 Allegheny County, Executive
 Philadelphia, Mayor and City Council
 Tennessee
 Knoxville, Mayor
 Texas
Houston, Mayor
 Virginia 
 State Senate and House of Delegates
 Washington
 Spokane, Mayor
11 November: Nigeria 
Bayelsa State, Governor
Kogi State, Governor

Unknown date
Canada, Toronto, Mayor by-election (tentatively scheduled for 26 June 2023)
India
Chhattisgarh, Legislative Assembly
Jammu and Kashmir, Legislative Assembly
Karnataka, Legislative Assembly
Madhya Pradesh, Legislative Assembly
Mizoram, Legislative Assembly
Rajasthan, Legislative Assembly
Telangana, Legislative Assembly
Malaysia, state elections
Kedah, Legislative Assembly (will take place no later than 2 September 2023)
Kelantan, Legislative Assembly (will take place no later than 27 August 2023)
Terengganu, Legislative Assembly (will take place no later than 30 August 2023)
Penang, Legislative Assembly (will take place no later than 1 October 2023)
Selangor, Legislative Assembly (will take place no later than 25 August 2023)
Negeri Sembilan, Legislative Assembly (will take place no later than 31 August 2023)
Trinidad and Tobago
Trinidad, Local elections
 Nigeria
Anambra, Local Government Councils and Chairmen
Kwara, Local Government Councils and Chairmen
Sri Lanka
Sri Lanka, Municipal Councils, Urban Councils and Divisional Councils
United States, municipal elections
Boise, Mayor
Dallas, Mayor
Evansville, Mayor
Memphis, Mayor
Salt Lake City, Mayor

References

See also

Political timelines of the 2020s by year
2023 elections
2023 in politics